The Cojmănești is a left tributary of the river Jilțul Slivilești in Romania. It flows into the Jilțul Slivilești in Slivilești.

References

Rivers of Romania
Rivers of Gorj County